The qualification for 2004 Men's Olympic Volleyball Tournament was held from 7 September 2003 to 30 May 2004.

Means of qualification

Host country
FIVB reserved a vacancy for the 2004 Summer Olympics host country to participate in the tournament.

2003 World Cup

Venues: 
Dates: 16–29 November 2003
The top three teams qualified for the 2004 Summer Olympics.

Continental qualification tournaments

Africa
Venue:  El Menzah Sports Palace, Tunis, Tunisia
Dates: 5–10 January 2004
The winners qualified for the 2004 Summer Olympics. The runners-up qualified for the 2004 World Olympic Qualification Tournaments.

|}

|}

Asia and Oceania
The 2004 Asian Olympic Qualification Tournament combined with 2004 2nd World Olympic Qualification Tournament. The hosts Japan and the top four ranked teams except Japan from the 2003 Asian Championship competed in the tournament. The top ranked among the five teams except the 2004 2nd World Olympic Qualification Tournament winners qualified for the 2004 Summer Olympics as the 2004 Asian Olympic Qualification Tournament winners.

Europe

Venue:  Arena Leipzig, Leipzig, Germany
Dates: 5–10 January 2004
The winners qualified for the 2004 Summer Olympics.

North America

Venue:  Coliseo Héctor Solá Bezares, Caguas, Puerto Rico
Dates: 4–10 January 2004
The winners qualified for the 2004 Summer Olympics. The second and third ranked teams qualified for the 2004 World Olympic Qualification Tournaments.

South America
Venue:  Poliedro de Caracas, Caracas, Venezuela
Dates: 9–11 January 2004
The winners qualified for the 2004 Summer Olympics. The runners-up qualified for the 2004 World Olympic Qualification Tournaments.

|}

|}

World qualification tournaments
Qualified teams
Hosts

Qualified through the 2003 Asian Championship.
 *
 *
 *
 *

 
Qualified through the Continental Olympic Qualification Tournament or the FIVB World Ranking as of January 2004.
  (as African Olympic Qualification Tournament 2nd place)
 (as World Ranking for European Team)
 (as World Ranking for European Team)
 (as World Ranking for European Team)
 (as North American Olympic Qualification Tournament 2nd place)
 (as North American Olympic Qualification Tournament 3rd place)
 (as South American Olympic Qualification Tournament 2nd place)

* The top four teams from 2003 Asian Championship were predetermined to be in 2nd tournament in Japan.

 –  and  replaced Chinese Taipei and Egypt, who withdrew from the tournament.

1st tournament
Venue:  Centro de Desportos e Congressos de Matosinhos, Matosinhos, Portugal
Dates: 21–23 May 2004
All times are Western European Summer Time (UTC+01:00).
The winners qualified for the 2004 Summer Olympics.

|}

|}

2nd tournament
Venue:  Tokyo Metropolitan Gymnasium, Tokyo, Japan
Dates: 22–30 May 2004
All times are Japan Standard Time (UTC+09:00).
The winners and the best Asian team except the winners qualified for the 2004 Summer Olympics.

|}

|}

3rd tournament
Venue:  Madrid Arena, Madrid, Spain
Dates: 28–30 May 2004
All times are Central European Summer Time (UTC+02:00).
The winners qualified for the 2004 Summer Olympics.

|}

|}

External links
Results of the 2004 African Olympic Qualification Tournament at FIVB.org
Official website of the 2004 European Olympic Qualification Tournament
Results of the 2004 North American Olympic Qualification Tournament at FIVB.org
Results of the 2004 South American Olympic Qualification Tournament at FIVB.org
Official website of the 2004 1st World Olympic Qualification Tournament
Official website of the 2004 2nd World Olympic Qualification Tournament
Official website of the 2004 3rd World Olympic Qualification Tournament

M
Olympic Qualification Men
2004